Acts 13 is the thirteenth chapter of the Acts of the Apostles in the New Testament of the Christian Bible. It records the first missionary journey of Paul and Barnabas to Cyprus and Pisidia. The book containing this chapter is anonymous but early Christian tradition uniformly affirmed that Luke composed this book as well as the Gospel of Luke.

Text
The original text was written in Koine Greek. This chapter is divided into 52 verses.

Textual witnesses
Some early manuscripts containing the text of this chapter are:
 Codex Vaticanus (AD 325–350)
 Codex Sinaiticus (330–360)
 Codex Bezae (~400)
 Codex Alexandrinus (400–440)
 Codex Ephraemi Rescriptus (~450; extant verses 2–52)
 Codex Laudianus (~550)

Old Testament references
 : Psalm ; 
 : Psalm 
 Acts 13:34: Isaiah 55:3
 : Psalm 
 : 
 :

New Testament references
 Acts 13:33: Hebrews 1:5; 5:5

Locations

This chapter mentions the following places (in order of appearance):
 Antioch, Syria
 Seleucia, i.e. Seleucia Pieria, the port serving Antioch
 Cyprus: Salamis, Paphos
 Perga, Pamphylia
 Jerusalem
 Antioch, Pisidia
 Iconium, Phrygia

Timeline 
The first missionary journey of Paul and Barnabas took place about AD 47–48.

The church in Antioch (13:1–3)

This section opens the account of Paul's first missionary journey (Acts 13:1-14:28) which starts with a deliberate and prayerful step of the church in Antioch, a young congregation established by those who scattered from persecution in Jerusalem and has grown into an active missionary church. Paul's mission was not his own initiative, but by the command of the Holy Spirit (verses 2, 4), with the framework of prayer and fasting forming an inclusio at the end of this first journey.

Verse 1
 Now in the church that was at Antioch there were certain prophets and teachers:
 Barnabas,
 Simeon who was called Niger,
 Lucius of Cyrene,
 Manaen who had been brought up with Herod the tetrarch, and
 Saul.

Verse 2
 As they ministered to the Lord and fasted, the Holy Spirit said, "Now separate to Me Barnabas and Saul for the work to which I have called them."

Journey from Antioch to Cyprus (13:4–5)
The first main destination of the missionary journey is the island of Cyprus, Barnabas' home area (Acts 4:36). There were already believers who scattered due to the persecution in Jerusalem (Acts 11:19), but Barnabas and Saul came on a mission ('sent out by the Holy Spirit', verse 4) to visit formal meeting-places of Jewish communities they pass through (verse 5) to preach 
the gospel.

Verse 4

 So, being sent out by the Holy Spirit, they went down to Seleucia, and from there they sailed to Cyprus.
 "They": Barnabas and Saul (Acts 13:2)

The governor and the guru (13:6–12)

The account of Saul/Paul displaying the supernatural power of the Holy Spirit (verse 9)
that led a proconsul into faith (verse 12) parallels Simon Peter's encounters with Simon Magus, and with Ananias and Sapphira.

Verse 6
 Now when they had gone through the island to Paphos, they found a certain sorcerer, a false prophet, a Jew whose name was Bar-Jesus,
It is noted from his failure to recognize the truth of gospel (verse 8) that Elymas is a 'false prophet', using the term magus (verses 6, 8), which is always in negative sense in the book of Acts.

Verse 7
 who was with the proconsul, Sergius Paulus, an intelligent man. This man called for Barnabas and Saul and sought to hear the word of God.
The correct Greek title (anthupatos, proconsul) is used for a governor of a senatorial province. A 'Sergius Paulus' is mentioned in a Roman inscription as a holder of an office in Rome under Claudius (at about the same period) and his family also seems to have a tie to Pisidia.

Verse 9
 However, Saul (who is the same as Paul), full of the Holy Spirit, fixed his eyes on him

The change of name from Saul (a Hebrew name) to Paul (Latin name; verse 9) is appropriate as he moved deeper into "Gentile territory", and very common for diaspora Jews to have Greek or Latin names alongside their Hebrew names.

Verse 12
 Then the proconsul believed, when he saw what had been done, being astonished at the teaching of the Lord.
Luke presents Sergius Paulus as the first Gentile ruler to believe the gospel. Unlike Cornelius (Acts 10:2), there is no evidence that Sergius attended the temple or was a God-fearer. This pagan government official was amazed at the power of God and believed the truth.

Journey from Cyprus to Pisidia (13:13-52)
It is customary for Paul to start his mission by visiting the local synagogue (verse 14). Paul's sermon in a synagogue of Antioch in Pisidia (13:16—41) serves as the centerpiece of a long and tightly constructed travel-and-mission account, moving into new places (13:13-14, 51; 14:6-7), then successively going back retracing each stage of the journey (14:21, 24–26). All the sites visited by Paul on this journey eventually fall within the territory of the Roman province of Galatia in the first century, so it could be assumed that 'these are the churches Paul addresses in the Epistle to the Galatians'.

Verse 13

Now when Paul and his party set sail from Paphos, they came to Perga in Pamphylia; and John, departing from them, returned to Jerusalem.
This John, also mentioned in verse 5, was John Mark, the nephew of Barnabas (Acts 12:25). Whatever the trouble was between Paul and John Mark, it was enough for Paul not to want John Mark to accompany him on a later journey, which caused a rift between Paul and Barnabas. John Mark would prove faithful later in Paul's ministry (see 2 Timothy 4:11).

Verse 33
God has fulfilled this for us their children, in that He has raised up Jesus. As it is also written in the second Psalm:
‘You are My Son,
Today I have begotten You.’
Citing , which is also quoted and used for exposition in Hebrews 1:5; 5:5.

Verse 34
 And as concerning that he raised him up from the dead, 
 now no more to return to corruption,
 he said on this wise,
 I will give you the sure mercies of David.
Citing Isaiah 55:3

See also 

 Related Bible parts: Psalm 2, Isaiah 55, Habakkuk 1, Matthew 1, Matthew 3, Mark 1, Luke 3, John 1, Acts 1, Acts 9, Acts 11, Acts 12, Acts 14, Acts 15, Acts 22, Acts 26, Hebrews 1, Hebrews 5

References

Sources

External links
 King James Bible - Wikisource
English Translation with Parallel Latin Vulgate
Online Bible at GospelHall.org (ESV, KJV, Darby, American Standard Version, Bible in Basic English)
Multiple bible versions at Bible Gateway (NKJV, NIV, NRSV etc.)
 Acts 13 OEB

 
13